The Most Reverend Charles Gabriel Angela Palmer- Buckle (born 15 June 1950 in Axim, Ghana) is a Ghanaian Archbishop of the Roman Catholic Church, a former teacher and a key figure in the political scene in Ghana. He is currently the Metropolitan Archbishop of Cape Coast and is the second Ghanaian native to become Archbishop of Accra. Installed in 2005, he became the 4th Ordinary for Accra since its establishment as a diocese. He was also the first Bishop of Koforidua.

Early life
Charles Gabriel Palmer-Buckle was born on 15 June 1950 in Axim, Ghana with siblings of 6 brothers and 5 sisters.

Education
Palmer-Buckle was educated in the Pope John Senior High School and Minor Seminary in Ghana and at the Pontifical Urban University where he obtained a bachelor's degree in Philosophy and another in Sacred Theology. He also holds a Doctorate Degree in Sacred Theology from the Pontifical Salesian University in Rome.

Work as a teacher
Palmer-Buckle had also been a chaplain and teacher at both the Pope John Senior High School and Minor Seminary and at Achimota School.

Episcopal career
Palmer-Buckle was ordained a priest on 12 December 1976 in Accra, appointed as Bishop of Koforidua on 6 July 1992, consecrated on 6 January 1993 and appointed as an Archbishop of Accra on 28 May 2005.

From 1994 to 2004 Palmer-Buckle served as the Bishop-Chairman for the Department of Socio-Economic Development of the Catholic Bishop’s Conference in Ghana, and from 1995 to 2003 was President of Caritas Africa Region and First Vice President of Caritas International, a federation of 198 member-organizations in 154 countries all over the world with headquarters in the Vatican City. He was appointed the first Bishop of the newly created diocese of Koforidua in 1992 and on 30 March 2005, he became the Metropolitan Archbishop of Accra.

Palmer-Buckle was a member of the nine-member National Reconciliation Commission (NRC) from May 2002 to October 2004 whose stated mission was to bring truth and reconciliation in Ghana after human rights abuses and atrocities.

In 2002 he apologized on behalf of Africans for the part Africans played in the slave trade, and the apology was accepted by bishop John Ricard of Pensacola-Tallahassee.

Palmer-Buckle has remained vocal in the political scene of Ghana and Africa on issues including political violence and homosexuality.

See also 

 Andrew Campbell (priest)
 Peter Turkson

References

External links

20th-century Roman Catholic bishops in Ghana
1950 births
Living people
Pope John Senior High School and Minor Seminary alumni
Pontifical Urban University alumni
Ghanaian Roman Catholic archbishops
Roman Catholic archbishops of Accra
Roman Catholic bishops of Koforidua